Zhang Yi may refer to:

Zhang Yi (Warring States period) (bef. 329 BC–309 BC), strategist during the Warring States Period
Zhang Yi (Junsi) (c. 167–230), official of Shu Han during the Three Kingdoms period
Zhang Yi (Bogong) (died 264), general of Shu Han during the Three Kingdoms period
Zhang Yi (Cao Wei) (fl. 227–232), author and doctor of Cao Wei of the Three Kingdoms period
Zhang Yi (Tang dynasty) (died 783), official during the Tang Dynasty
Chang Yi (actor) (born 1945), or Zhang Yi, Hong Kong actor
Zhang Yi (politician) (born 1950), Communist Party Chief of Ningxia
Chang Yi (director) (1951-2020), Taiwanese film director
Yi Zhang (biochemist), Chinese-American biochemist
Zhang Yi (actor) (born 1978), Chinese actor
Zhang Yi (badminton) (born 1980), Chinese badminton player
Zhang Yi (triathlete) (born 1987), female Chinese triathlete
Zhang Yi (footballer) (born 1993), Chinese footballer

See also
Zhang Ni (died 254), often misspelled as Zhang Yi, general of Shu Han during the Three Kingdoms period
Changyi (disambiguation)